Kopojno-Parcele  is a village in the administrative district of Gmina Zagórów, within Słupca County, Greater Poland Voivodeship, in west-central Poland.

The village has a population of 148.

References

Kopojno-Parcele